Land Instruments International (AMETEK Land) is a manufacturer of industrial sensors and measuring devices founded in the UK in 1947. It was acquired by the Process & Analytical Instruments Division of Ametek in 2006.

Products 
 Fixed Spot Non-Contact Thermometers / Pyrometers
 Fixed Thermal Imagers and Line Scanners
 Portable Non-Contact Thermometers
 Portable Gas Analysers
 Opacity and Dust Monitors
 Carbon Monoxide Detectors

Services 
 Hazardous Area Certification
 On-Site Servicing
 Training
 Technical Support
 Certification and Calibration
 Global Service Centres

References

External links 
 

British companies established in 1947
1947 establishments in England